Dr. John Lord House is a historic home located at Busti in Chautauqua County, New York. It is a two-and-a-half-story wood-frame Gothic Revival–style residence built in 1867.

It was restored by R and JG Martin.

It was listed on the National Register of Historic Places in 1991.

References

Houses on the National Register of Historic Places in New York (state)
Gothic Revival architecture in New York (state)
Houses completed in 1867
Houses in Chautauqua County, New York
National Register of Historic Places in Chautauqua County, New York